Santa Rose Church may refer to:

Santa Rosa Church, Florence, a church in Florence, Italy
Santa Rosa Church, Paramaribo, a church in Paramaribo, Suriname